The rusty-collared seedeater (Sporophila collaris) is a species of bird in the family Thraupidae, formerly placed in the related Emberizidae.

It is found in Argentina, Bolivia, Brazil, Paraguay, and Uruguay. Its natural habitats are subtropical or tropical seasonally wet or flooded lowland grassland, swamps, and heavily degraded former forest.

The rusty-collared seedeater was included by the French polymath Georges-Louis Leclerc, Comte de Buffon in 1775 in his Histoire Naturelle des Oiseaux. The bird was also illustrated in a hand-coloured plate engraved by François-Nicolas Martinet in the Planches Enluminées D'Histoire Naturelle which was produced under the supervision of Edme-Louis Daubenton to accompany Buffon's text.  Neither the plate caption nor Buffon's description included a scientific name but in 1783 the Dutch naturalist Pieter Boddaert coined the binomial name Loxia collaris in his catalogue of the Planches Enluminées. Buffon mistaken believed that his specimen had come from Angola. In 1904 the Austrian ornithologist Carl Eduard Hellmayr designated the type location as Rio de Janeiro in Brazil. The rusty-collared seedeater is now placed in the genus Sporophila that was introduced by the German ornithologist Jean Cabanis in 1844. The genus name combines the Ancient Greek  meaning "seed" and  meaning "-loving". The specific collaris is Latin for "of the neck".

Three subspecies are recognised:
 S. c. ochrascen Hellmayr, 1904 – Bolivia to south-central Brazil
 S. c. collaris (Boddaert, 1783) – east Brazil
 S. c. melanocephala (Vieillot, 1817) – southwest Brazil, Paraguay and north Argentina, also southeast Brazil and Uruguay

References

rusty-collared seedeater
Birds of Argentina
Birds of Bolivia
Birds of Brazil
Birds of the Pantanal
Birds of Paraguay
Birds of Uruguay
rusty-collared seedeater
Taxonomy articles created by Polbot